Stuart James Andrew (born 25 November 1971) is a Welsh politician serving as Parliamentary Under-Secretary of State for Sport, Tourism, Heritage and Civil Society since September 2022 and Parliamentary Under-Secretary of State for Equalities since October 2022. Andrew previously served as Government Deputy Chief Whip from 2020 to 2022, Minister of State for Housing from February to July 2022, and Minister of State for Prisons and Probation from July to September 2022. A member of the Conservative Party, he has been Member of Parliament (MP) for Pudsey since 2010.

Andrew was born in Anglesey, Wales. He was a councillor on Wrexham County Borough Council from 1995 to 1999. Elected as a Conservative, he defected to the Labour Party in 1998, before rejoining the Conservative Party in 2000. He was a councillor on Leeds City Council from 2003 to 2010. He was elected for Pudsey at the 2010 general election. He served as Government Deputy Chief Whip in the House of Commons from 2020 to 2022 when he was appointed Minister of State for Housing.

Early life
Andrew was born on 25 November 1971 in Anglesey, Wales. He grew up in Anglesey, and was state educated at Ysgol David Hughes in Menai Bridge.
After leaving school he worked for the Department of Social Security. In 1994 he took a job with the British Heart Foundation, before roles at Hope House Children's Hospice and East Lancashire Hospice. Before being elected to Parliament he led the fundraising team for Martin House Hospice.

Early political career
Andrew was first elected as a Conservative councillor to represent the Maesydre ward on Wrexham County Borough Council in 1995. He stood unsuccessfully as a parliamentary candidate for Wrexham in the 1997 general election. In 1998, he left the Conservatives and defected to the Labour Party, citing issues with the "direction of the party". Andrew was re-elected as a Labour councillor in 1999, but resigned from the council later in the year.

He rejoined the Conservative Party in 2000 and, after moving to Leeds, was elected to Leeds City Council between 2003 and 2010. He represented the Aireborough ward and then Guiseley and Rawdon ward, following boundary changes in 2004.

Parliamentary career
Andrew was elected as MP for Pudsey in the 2010 general election, taking the seat from Labour with a majority of 1,659 votes, and subsequently resigned from Leeds City Council.

Andrew served on the Welsh Affairs Select Committee between November 2010 and November 2012.

On 22 February 2012 Andrew was headbutted and punched in a House of Commons bar during a disturbance created by Scottish Labour MP Eric Joyce, but tweeted the next day that, "I'm OK." Joyce was charged with common assault, A fourth charge was added on 9 March, and he was fined £3,000 and ordered to pay £1,400 in compensation to Andrew and other victims, but not given a custodial sentence. In a statement before the House of Commons on 12 March 2012, Joyce apologised personally to his victims, stated that he had resigned from the Labour Party, and that he intended to complete his current term as an MP but not seek re-election.

In 2012, Andrew brought forward a bill that would create a new power for governors to "destroy or otherwise dispose of any unauthorised property found within a prison or an escort vehicle". The bill was supported both by the government and the Labour Party, with Shadow Secretary of State for Justice Sadiq Khan saying he backed the bill.

During the debates on the Marriage (Same Sex Couples) Act 2013, which he subsequently voted for, Andrew responded to comments from Gerald Howarth about "aggressive homosexuals" by telling of a time when he had been attacked in the street and beaten unconscious "because of who and what I am".

At the 2015 general election, Pudsey was considered to be one of the most marginal seats in the country. However, Andrew retained the seat through increasing his majority to 4501.

In January 2016, Andrew was one of 72 MPs who voted down an amendment in Parliament on rental homes being "fit for human habitation" who were themselves landlords who derived an income from a property.

In May 2016, it emerged that Andrew was one of a number of Conservative MPs being investigated by police in the 2015 general election party spending investigation, for allegedly spending more than the legal limit on constituency election campaign expenses. However, in May 2017, the Crown Prosecution Service said that while there was evidence of inaccurate spending returns, it did not "meet the test" for further action.

Andrew was appointed Vice-Chairman of the Conservative Party, with particular responsibility for cities, on 23 September 2016.

Andrew supported Brexit in the 2016 referendum.

Parliamentary Under-Secretary of State for Wales and for Defence Procurement
At the 2017 general election, Andrew was re-elected with an increased vote share, but saw his majority cut to 331. He became Assistant Whip (HM Treasury) in June 2017 and Parliamentary Under-Secretary (Wales Office) in January 2018, before moving to be Parliamentary Under-Secretary (Ministry of Defence).

In July 2019, Andrew wrote to Bradford Council to oppose plans to introduce a new link road in south east Bradford, impacting the Pudsey constituency.

In July 2019, he moved back to the Whips Office, holding the office of vice-chamberlain of the Household.

In 2019, on both 14 October and 19 December, Andrew was ceremonially taken hostage by the Queen at Buckingham Palace for the duration of her speeches to Parliament.

Treasurer of the Household
Andrew's majority increased at the 2019 general election. In the February 2020 reshuffle he was appointed Deputy Chief Whip and promoted to Treasurer of the Household.

On 10 September 2020, Andrew stood in for Jacob Rees-Mogg as Acting Leader of the House of Commons in Business Questions as Rees-Mogg was self-isolating awaiting the results of a COVID-19 test on his son.

During the COVID-19 pandemic emergency arrangements, he held a large number of proxy votes for other Conservative MPs, and at one stage in 2021 personally controlled a majority of votes in the House of Commons. He did not always cast these proxy votes the same way, instead following the instructions of individual MPs.

He was sworn of the Privy Council of the United Kingdom in 2021.

Minister of State for Housing
In a cabinet reshuffle on 8 February 2022, Andrew was appointed Minister of State for Housing.

On 6 July 2022, Andrew resigned from the role of Minister of State for Housing due to the recent scandals involving the former Conservative Party leader and Prime Minister Boris Johnson, most recently the Chris Pincher scandal. He stated that "There comes a time when you have to look at your own personal integrity and that time is now. Therefore, given recent events I have no other choice to resign. Our party, particularly our members and more importantly our great country, deserve better."

Minister of State for Prisons and Probation
Andrew was appointed as Minister of State for Prisons and Probation in the 2022 British cabinet reshuffle.

Parliamentary Under-Secretary of State for Sport, Tourism, Heritage and Civil Society and for Equalities

On 8 September 2022, Andrew was appointed as Parliamentary Under-Secretary of State for Sport, Tourism, Heritage and Civil Society. His role includes
 Minister for Equalities
 Sport
 Tourism
 Civil Society (including loneliness)
 Youth
 Ceremonials (including the Coronation)
 Events including Eurovision, Unboxed, City of City of Culture
 Arts and Heritage in the Commons.

On 27 October 2022, Andrew was appointed to a second ministerial position, as Parliamentary Under-Secretary of State for Equalities.

Personal life
Andrew lives in Guiseley, West Yorkshire and London. He is openly gay and a patron of LGBT+ Conservatives. During the 2022 FIFA World Cup, Andrew expressed his support for the OneLove campaign by publicly wearing an armband at the England v. Wales game.

Notes

References

External links

 
 Stewart Andrew MP Conservative Party profile
 Stuart Andrew Profile at New Statesman
 

1971 births
Living people
People educated at Ysgol David Hughes
Conservative Party (UK) councillors
Conservative Party (UK) MPs for English constituencies
Councillors in Leeds
Councillors in Wales
LGBT members of the Parliament of the United Kingdom
Gay politicians
Welsh LGBT politicians
English LGBT politicians
Labour Party (UK) councillors
Ministers of State for Housing (UK)
Members of the Privy Council of the United Kingdom
UK MPs 2010–2015
UK MPs 2015–2017
UK MPs 2017–2019
UK MPs 2019–present
Welsh-speaking politicians
People from Anglesey